Shubinka is a rural locality (a settlement) in Pokrovsky Selsoviet, Rodinsky District, Altai Krai, Russia. The population was 25 as of 2013. There are 3 streets.

Geography 
Shubinka is located 37 km north of Rodino (the district's administrative centre) by road. Pokrovka is the nearest rural locality.

References 

Rural localities in Rodinsky District